John Graham Wallace (born 23 August 1966) is an English author and illustrator of children's picture books.

Early life 

Wallace was born in Felixstowe and grew up in Market Rasen, Lincolnshire. He attended De Aston School and went on to study Theology at Cambridge University. He worked on the Kingston, Jamaica Daily Gleaner as a cartoonist.

Published work 

He has illustrated and written many children's books, many of which have been translated. His book The Twins was made into a television series on CITV in 2000. His work includes Mr. Bumble, The Jungle Kids, Wonders of America, Anything for You, Monster Toddler, and Pirate Boy.

References 

1966 births
Living people
English children's writers
English children's book illustrators
People from Felixstowe
People from Market Rasen
Alumni of the University of Cambridge
English male writers
People educated at De Aston School